The 2019 Speedway European Championship season was the seventh season of the Speedway European Championship (SEC) era, and the 19th UEM Individual Speedway European Championship. It was the sixth series under the promotion of One Sport Lts. of Poland.

The championship was won by Mikkel Michelsen, who beat Grigory Laguta in a run-off after both riders had finished the series tied on 45 points. Defending champion Leon Madsen, who missed one round through injury, also won a run-off with Kacper Woryna to finish third, while Bartosz Smektała completed the top five.

Qualification 
For the 2019 season, 15 permanent riders were joined at each SEC Final by one wildcard and two track reserves.

Defending champion, Leon Madsen from Denmark was automatically invited to participate in all final events, while Jarosław Hampel, Robert Lambert, Antonio Lindbäck and Mikkel Michelsen secured their participation in all final events thanks to being in the top five of the general classification in the 2018 season.

Five riders qualified through the SEC Challenge, while Nicki Pedersen, Anders Thomsen, Kai Huckenbeck, Paweł Przedpełski and Bartosz Smektała were named as series wildcards.

Qualified riders

Calendar

Qualification 
The calendar for qualification consisted of 3 Semi-final events and one SEC Challenge event.

Championship Series 
A four-event calendar was scheduled for the final series, with events in Germany, Poland and Denmark.

Final Classification

See also 
 2019 Speedway Grand Prix

References

External links 

2019
European Championship
Speedway European Championship